Cynwyd may refer to:

Places:
 Cynwyd, Denbighshire, in Wales
Bala Cynwyd, or Cynwyd, a community in Lower Merion Township, Pennsylvania, USA

Transportation:
Cynwyd Line, a SEPTA Regional Rail line in Pennsylvania
Cynwyd station (SEPTA), a SEPTA Regional Rail station in Bala Cynwyd, Pennsylvania, USA
Cynwyd railway station (Wales), a former railway station in Cynwyd, Denbighshire, Wales

Other:
Cynwyd of Alt Clut, or Cinuit (6th century), possible ruler of Alt Clut in modern-day Scotland
Cynwyd Forest Quarry, a protected area in Denbighshire, Wales